Eruca is a genus of flowering plants in the family Brassicaceae, native to the Mediterranean region, which includes the leaf vegetable known as arugula or rocket.

The number of species is disputed, with some authorities only accepting a single species, while others accept up to five species. The following species are accepted by the Med-Checklist:
Eruca loncholoma (Pomel) O.E.Schulz
Eruca pinnatifida (Desf.) Pomel (syn. E. sativa subsp. pinnatifida (Desf.) Batt.; E. vesicaria subsp. pinnatifida (Desf.) Emberger & Maire)
Eruca sativa Mill. (syn. E. vesicaria subsp. sativa (Mill.) Thell.)
Eruca setulosa Boiss. & Reuter
Eruca vesicaria (L.) Cav.
When treated as a monospecific genus, all are included within E. vesicaria.

They can be both annual plants and biennial plants growing to 20–100 cm tall. The leaves are deeply pinnately lobed with four to ten small lateral lobes and a large terminal lobe. The flowers are 2–4 cm diameter, arranged in a corymb, with the typical Brassicaceae flower structure; the petals are creamy white with purple veins, and the stamens yellow. The fruit is a siliqua (pod) 12–25 mm long with an apical beak, and containing several seeds.

References

Brassicaceae
Brassicaceae genera
Taxa named by Philip Miller